Saint Ava is a Roman Catholic Catholic saint, the daughter of Pepin II of Aquitaine. She was born on the 29th of April 845 AD. She was cured of blindness by Saint Rainfredis before becoming a Benedictine nun. How she became blind, whether from a birth defect or a childhood illness is unknown. Saint Ava’s feast day is the 29th of April, and she is the patron saint of the blind. 

Saint Ava presided as a Benedictine nun dianant in the County of Hainaut in what is now known as Belgium. This would have made her a woman of great spiritual and material standing even without the bolstering influence of Saint Rainfredis having cured her of her blindness.How she became blind, whether from a birth defect or a childhood illness, is not known.

Saint Ava was an abbess by the time of her death, the highest office a woman could hold within the religious hierarchy of the Catholic faith at that time. Her veneration is now relatively obscure.

Saint Ava’s father, King Pepin II, was rumored to have abandoned Christianity and gone to live among the Vikings, worshiping Woden, or Odin as he is more commonly known. Pepin’s reign was largely disastrous, involving ill-advised alliances with Viking warlords and several failed wars that saw him stripped of much of his power and status before his eventual abdication and death abroad from Aquitaine.

References

 St. Ava at Catholic Online
 Today's Saints, April 29

 Reference.com St.Avas history

Belgian Roman Catholic saints
Benedictine nuns
9th-century Christian saints
Christian female saints of the Middle Ages
9th-century French women